Mark Pearce (born 1976 in Coventry) is an English actor.

At the age of 12 Pearce made his professional stage debut in Cinderella at Belgrade Theatre Coventry.

He went on to study English and Drama at University College of St. Martin's Lancaster before heading to London to study acting at the Central School of Speech and Drama.

Notable credits include his portrayal of ‘Fletcher’ originally played by Ronnie Barker, in the stage adaptation of the BBC sitcom Porridge at The Lowry Manchester, written by the original writers Dick Clement and Ian La Frenais.

Pearce created the role of Uncle Mamaji in the world premiere of Yann Martel’s Life of Pi in 2007.

In 2009 he performed in a UK tour of Allo Allo.

Recent West-End appearances include Thénardier in Les Misérables at Sondheim Theatre Jake Blues in The Music Of The Blues Brothers - A Tribute at The Arts Theatre and Champagne Charlie at Wilton's Music Hall.

He originated the role of "Hospital Ghost" in the original world premiere production of Ghost the Musical in Manchester.

Pearce was cast as Wild Thing in Carnaby Street - The Musical, directed by Bob Tomson. It toured the UK throughout 2013.

References

External links 
http://www.ghostthemusical.com
https://web.archive.org/web/20110708123119/https://actors.mandy.com/uk/view.php?uid=100141
http://www.britishtheatreguide.info/reviews/lifepi-rev.htm

Living people
English male musical theatre actors
English male stage actors
1976 births